A gens was a family in Ancient Rome in which all of the members typically bore the same nomen and claimed descent from a common ancestor.

Gens can also refer to:

People
 Jacob Gens (1903-1943), Jewish head of the Vilnius Ghetto
 Saint Gens (1104–1127), French hermit
 Véronique Gens (born 1966), French soprano singer
 Xavier Gens (born 1975), French film director

Other uses
 Gens (anthropology), a group of people related through their female or male ancestor
 Gens (band), Italian pop band
 Gens (behaviour), a specific lineage of animals sharing a specific behavioral trait, inherited from a common ancestor
 Gens (emulator), an emulator of the Sega Mega Drive / Genesis video game console